Alba Delgado (born January 6, 1991) is a Salvadoran  beauty pageant titleholder who was crowned Nuestra Belleza El Salvador in 2013. She competed at Miss Universe 2013, where she failed to make the top 16.

Pageantry

Nuestra Belleza El Salvador 2013
Alba Delgado was crowned Miss El Salvador Universe 2013 or Nuestra Belleza El Salvador Universo 2013 (in Spanish) at the Royal Decameron Salinitas Hotel in Los Cobanos on April 26, 2013.

Miss Universe 2013
Alba Delgado competed at the Miss Universe 2013 pageant in Moscow, Russia but she failed at the competition.

References

External links
Official Nuestra Belleza El Salvador website
Alba Delgado

1989 births
Living people
Miss Universe 2013 contestants
Salvadoran beauty pageant winners
Miss El Salvador winners